Burstyn, Burshtyn, Burshtin, Birshtyn, or Bursztyn are derived from Polish (bursztyn) or Ukrainian (Бурштин) for amber. It corresponds to German and Yiddish surname Bernstein. It may refer to:

People

 Burshtin (Hasidic dynasty)
 Ellen Burstyn, American actress, host of The Ellen Burstyn Show
 Gunther Burstyn (1879-1945), Austrian inventor and officer of the Austro-Hungarian Army
 Joseph Burstyn, American businessman, plaintiff in landmark Joseph Burstyn, Inc. v. Wilson case
 Mike Burstyn, American actor
 Igal Bursztyn, Israeli film director, writer, producer
 Feliza Bursztyn, Colombian sculptor

Places
 Burshtyn, Ukraine
 Burshtyn TES

See also
Joseph Burstyn, Inc. v. Wilson, (also referred to as the Miracle Decision), a landmark decision by the United States Supreme Court which largely marked the decline of motion picture censorship in the United States